Salvador Rogelio Ortega Martínez (born 26 July 1955) is a Mexican educator who was appointed interim Governor of Guerrero on 27 October 2014 following the resignation of Ángel Aguirre Rivero after the political scandal of the 43 missing students in Iguala. He served in office until 27 October 2015. Ortega Martinez was previously director of the Autonomous University of Guerrero.

References

External links
  Official website of the Governature of Guerrero  

1955 births
Living people
Mexican educators
People from Taxco
Governors of Guerrero